Shankar Kashinath Garge (शंकर काशीनाथ गर्गे) more popularly known as Natyachhatakar Diwakar  (नाट्यछटाकार दिवाकर) (18 January 1889 – 1 October 1931) was a Marathi writer whose mastery of the Natyachhata, a kind of dramatic monologue made him the only major Marathi writer to have used this literary form very successfully. He was born in Pune, Bombay Presidency.

He also wrote plays, short stories. He was particularly influenced by the writings of Robert Browning, William Wordsworth, William Shakespeare.

He did pioneering work in researching poems of a leading modern Marathi poet Keshavasuta.

He was a favourite writer of a few leading Marathi writers like Durga Bhagwat, Vijay Tendulkar, Sadanand Rege.

Ms. Bhagwat praises him in a book based on her long interviews. Mr. Tendulkar edited a book of Diwakar's Natyachhata's.

References

External links
Entry of Natyachhatakar Diwakar in Marathi Wikipedia  https://mr.wikipedia.org/s/u23
Entry of Natyachhatakar Diwakar in Marathi Vishwakosh https://marathivishwakosh.maharashtra.gov.in/khandas/khand7/index.php/component/content/article?id=13250

1889 births
1931 deaths
Marathi people
Writers from Pune
Marathi-language writers
20th-century Indian poets
Poets from Maharashtra